Elias van Nijmegen (1667, Nijmegen – January 24, 1755, Rotterdam), was an 18th-century painter from the Northern Netherlands.

Biography

According to the RKD he became a member of the Leiden Guild of St. Luke in 1689, but he moved to Rotterdam where he married in 1701 and became a member of the guild there the next year in 1702. He is known for ceiling and wall decorations and was the teacher of the Rotterdam painters Gerard Sanders (his nephew by marriage of his brother Tobias to the widow Sanders) and his son Dionys. His daughter Barbara also became a painter.

References

1667 births
1755 deaths
18th-century Dutch painters
18th-century Dutch male artists
Dutch male painters
People from Nijmegen
Painters from Leiden
Painters from Rotterdam